Rymer may refer to:

Surname
James Malcolm Rymer (1814–1884), Scottish writer of penny dreadfuls
Janice Rymer, British consultant gynaecologist
Józef Rymer (1882–1922), Polish and Silesian activist and politician
Laurie Rymer, (b. 1934), Australian rules footballer
Michael Rymer (b. 1963), Australian television and film director
Pamela Ann Rymer (1941–2011), United States federal judge
Russ Rymer, author and freelance journalist
Terry Rymer (b. 1967), English motorcycle road racer and truck racer
Thomas Rymer (c. 1643–1713), English historiographer royal
Thomas A. Rymer (1925–2016), American politician and judge

Given name
Rymer Liriano (b. 1991), Dominican professional baseball outfielder
Rymer Point, cape in the Canadian Arctic territory of Nunavut

See also
Paddle and rymer weir an old type of weir